Graeme Dott (born 12 May 1977) is a Scottish professional snooker player and snooker coach from Larkhall. He turned professional in 1994 and first entered the top 16 in 2001. He has won two ranking titles, the 2006 World Snooker Championship and the 2007 China Open, and was runner-up in the World Championships of 2004 and 2010. He reached number 2 in the world rankings in 2007, but a subsequent episode of clinical depression seriously affected his form, causing him to drop to number 28 for the 2009–10 season. He then recovered his form, regained his top-16 ranking, and reached a third World Championship final. In 2011, he published his autobiography, Frame of Mind: The Autobiography of the World Snooker Champion.

Career

Early career
After winning the UK Under-19 Championship in 1992 and Scottish Amateur Championship in 1993, Dott turned professional in 1994. He slowly climbed the rankings, reaching the top sixteen in 2001, where he remained until 2009. Early successes included reaching the quarter-final of the 1996 Welsh Open and qualifying for the World Championship for the first time in 1997. Dott was a runner-up in the 1999 Scottish Open, the 2001 British Open, the 2004 World Championship and the 2005 Malta Cup. He scored his first competitive 147 break in the 1999 British Open.

2006 World Championship victory

Dott started his campaign with an easy 10–3 victory over former champion John Parrott, before beating veteran Nigel Bond 13–9 in the second round. In his quarter-final match against Australia's Neil Robertson, Dott took a 12–8 lead, before being pegged back to 12–12, and then edging through the deciding frame to win 13–12. In the semi-finals, he faced then two-time champion Ronnie O'Sullivan in a rematch of their 2004 Championship final. They finished the second session tied 8–8, but Dott swept O'Sullivan in the third session en route to a 17–11 victory.

Dott faced Peter Ebdon in the final for the £200,000 prize. He began the last session leading 15–7, but Ebdon won six successive frames to reduce the deficit to two. Dott eventually won 18–14, after winning some vital frames with impressive clearances.

It stands as the longest final ever, and was, at the time, the latest to finish (John Higgins's victory over Mark Selby the following year now holds the record). The previous record holder had been the classic final frame black ball finish 1985 final between Englishman Steve Davis and Northern Irishman Dennis Taylor, which ended at 12:19 a.m. (GMT). The Dott–Ebdon match finished half an hour later, despite featuring three fewer frames, reflecting the slow overall pace of the match, so slow that both afternoon sessions only had six frames, rather than the usual eight. Moreover, at over 74 minutes, the 27th frame was the then longest in the history of the World Championship, beating the previous record of 70 minutes set by Canadian Cliff Thorburn and Welshman Doug Mountjoy, a record that would stand until 2009.

The victory over Ebdon took Dott's ranking up to number 6 for the 2006/2007 season, a career high at the time.

Post-title career
Dott shone in the 2006 UK Championship as well, reaching the semi-finals, where he lost 7–9 to Stephen Hendry (a player who Dott never managed to beat in a ranking tournament) after an earlier 7–5 lead. He briefly became the provisional world number one in the rankings system after overcoming Jamie Cope 9–5 to win the 2007 China Open, his second ranking tournament win. Prior to this, he disliked going to China, not helped by a disastrous match in 2002. However, going into the 2007 World Championship as defending champion, he suffered a shock 7–10 defeat in the first round to Ian McCulloch in the opening match of the tournament, which dented his prospects of remaining world number 1. Newly crowned world champion John Higgins overtook him. The loss against McCulloch also maintained the "Crucible curse", as Dott became the seventeenth consecutive first-time champion to lose his title the very next year.

The 2007–08 season was more of a struggle for Dott, who described his late-2007 form as "hopeless... nowhere near to playing a good enough standard". His season started promisingly, as he reached the semi-finals of the season-opening 2007 Shanghai Masters, where he defeated Michael Holt 5–4, tournament favourite Ding Junhui 5–1, and Stephen Lee 5–4, before losing his semi-final against Ryan Day 2–6, to close the gap on world number 1 John Higgins, who went out in the second round; however, Dott then won no further matches that season; a run of twelve consecutive defeats, including all five group matches in the 2007 Grand Prix, started from October 2007 onwards. In the 2007 UK Championship he was eliminated in the first round, 7–9, by unseeded Dave Harold, while in the Masters he lost 5–6 to eventual runner-up Stephen Lee for the third successive year. Another first-round elimination followed in the 2008 Malta Cup, this time to Mark Williams. In the 2008 Welsh Open he lost his opening match against Michael Judge 4–5. In frame 7, when leading 4–2, he missed the pack completely with his break-off after miscuing, and also failed to hit the bunch on his next shot after being snookered. Dott announced that he might miss the 2008 World Championship due to personal reasons, and his manager said he had been suffering from depression. However, he did eventually participate in the tournament, but was eliminated in the first round for the second year in a row, losing 7–10 to Joe Perry, dropping him to number 13 in the new world rankings, and finishing the season outside the top 32 in the one-year rankings.

Things did not improve in the early part of 2008–09, when a broken left arm sustained while playing football forced him to pull out of the 2008 Shanghai Masters and 2008 Grand Prix.

Dott won the Berlin leg of the World Series of Snooker, but withdrew from the Moscow event two days before it began, as his wife was preparing to give birth. He reached the second round of the 2009 World Championship for the first time since winning the title in 2006, but lost to Mark Selby 10–13, causing him to drop out of the top 16.

At the 2010 World Championship, Dott produced an unlikely run to his third World final in six years. He had not had much success in the 2009–10 season going into the World Championship, with only one ranking last 16 finish in the 2010 Welsh Open. However, a newly inspired Dott convincingly knocked out Peter Ebdon in the first round 10–5. He then thrashed fellow Scot Stephen Maguire 13–6 in the second round, and for the first time since winning the title in 2006, advanced to the quarter-finals where he recovered from 10 to 12 behind to see off Mark Allen 13–12. In his 17–14 defeat of Mark Selby in the semi-final, he scored the second 146 clearance in the 83-year history of the World Championship (the first had been scored by Mark Allen just days earlier in his second round match). Dott was eventually defeated in the final 13–18 by Neil Robertson, who had never beaten Dott previously, an ironic twist after Dott had defeated previous champion Ebdon for the first time in winning his own title in 2006. Despite having to settle for runner-up spot, Dott's efforts were ultimately rewarded with a return to the top 16 for 2010/2011.

He returned a year later with a strong campaign at the World Championship, beating Mark King and Ali Carter before losing to in-form Judd Trump in the quarter-finals. He finished the 2010–11 season ranked world number 10.

2011/2012 season
Dott missed the first ranking event of the 2011–12 season, the Australian Goldfields Open due a neck injury, but he took part in the remaining seven ranking tournaments. He was knocked out in the first round in the Shanghai Masters and Welsh Open and didn't get past the last 16 of the 2011 UK Championship, German Masters or the China Open. Dott's best run of the season came at the World Open, where he beat Barry Hawkins and Marcus Campbell, before losing 1–5 to Stephen Lee in the quarter-finals. He also reached the quarter-finals of the Masters, where he was defeated by John Higgins 3–6.

Dott lost 2–4 to Ben Woollaston in the final of Event 3 of the minor-ranking Players Tour Championship, after earlier having overcome Ronnie O'Sullivan, Stephen Hendry and John Higgins. He also reached three semi-finals after playing in 11 of the 12 events throughout the season. Those results meant that Dott finished 7th on the PTC Order of Merit and therefore qualified to the last 16 of the Finals, where he lost 2–4 to Joe Perry.
Dott played in the first ever professional snooker tournament in South America, the non-ranking Brazil Masters, and reached the final only to be whitewashed 0–5 by Shaun Murphy. He also lost in the final of the Snooker Shoot-Out to Barry Hawkins, in a tournament where the winner of each round is decided by a 10-minute frame.

Dott's season came to an unceremonious end when he suffered his heaviest ever World Championship defeat, losing to Joe Perry 1–10. He stated after the match that it was the worst he had played as a professional. Nevertheless, he maintained his place in the elite top 16 at number 13.

2012/2013 season
During the 2012/2013 season, Dott lost in the last 16 of the 2012 UK Championship (2–6 to Shaun Murphy), the German Masters (4–5 to Murphy), the Welsh Open (1–4 to Pankaj Advani), the World Open (0–5 to Neil Robertson), and the China Open (4–5 to Marcus Campbell). He reached the quarter-finals of the Wuxi Classic, where he lost 0–5 to Mark Davis, and the Shanghai Masters, where he lost 4–5 to Judd Trump.

At the 2013 Masters, Dott defeated Stephen Maguire 6–5 and Trump 6–1 to reach the semi-finals. Despite taking a 4–1 lead in his semi-final match, Dott lost 5–6 to eventual tournament winner Mark Selby.

At the World Championship, Dott defeated Peter Ebdon 10–6 in a first-round match that lasted 7 hours 18 minutes, with an extra session added after the players failed to complete the match in the time allotted for the first two sessions. After the match, Dott criticised Ebdon's slow, deliberative style of play and called for a rule to limit the amount of time a player could spend over a shot. Dott became the only Scottish player to reach the second round, after John Higgins, Stephen Maguire, Marcus Campbell, and Alan McManus all suffered first-round defeats. Facing Shaun Murphy in his second-round match, he trailed 2–6 after the first session. During the second session, he complained about receiving static shocks when he touched the table, and the players took their mid-session interval a frame early while the carpet was sprayed with water to address the problem. Dott managed to level the match at 8–8 after the second session, but went on to lose 11–13. His defeat meant that, for the first time since 1988, no Scottish player competed in the World Championship quarter-finals.

2013/2014 season
Dott's 2013/2014 season got off to a poor start, as he was whitewashed 0–5 by Jimmy Robertson in the last 64 of the season's first major ranking event, the 2013 Wuxi Classic. More disappointing results followed, including a 2–4 loss to Ratchayothin Yotharuck in the last 128 of the 2013 Indian Open, but he recovered to reach the semi-finals of the International Championship, where he lost 7–9 to eventual tournament winner Ding Junhui. He reached the last 16 of the 2013 UK Championship, but was beaten 2–6 by Mark Selby. He advanced to the quarter-finals of the World Open and reeled off four frames in a row to level his match against Shaun Murphy, but the Englishman fluked the final black in the decider to defeat him 5–4. At the China Open, Dott reached another quarter-final but lost 3–5 to world number one Neil Robertson. He missed out on playing in the World Championship for the first time since 1999 as he was knocked out by Kyren Wilson 7–10 in the final qualifying round. Dott ended the season outside the top 16 for the first time in six years, as world number 17.

In July 2014, Dott started coaching snooker professionally to help encourage and influence the rising number of younger players within his native Scotland.

2014/2015 season
Dott's first quarter-final appearance of the season came at the Shanghai Masters after he defeated Yan Bingtao 5–2 and Shaun Murphy 5–3, but he lost 2–5 to Ding Junhui. He suffered a 1–6 first round loss to Craig Steadman at the International Championship, before whitewashing Robert Milkins 6–0 to face Neil Robertson in the fourth round of the 2014 UK Championship. He went 5–0 up, only for Robertson to level at 5–5, before Dott won the decider to reach the quarter-finals of the event for the first time since 2006. Dott said that he had reverted to the way he played in 2010, with a more carefree approach to the game which he felt had helped his good form in the tournament. In the quarter-finals, he once again let his lead slip but this time couldn't recover as Stuart Bingham came back from 1–4 down to defeat him 6–5. At the inaugural World Grand Prix, Dott came through a pair of deciding frames against John Higgins and Liang Wenbo, before losing 1–4 to Ronnie O'Sullivan in the quarter-finals.

2015/2016 season
Dott advanced to the third round of the International Championship courtesy of wins over Jamie Burnett and Peter Ebdon, but he was defeated 1–6 by Neil Robertson. He lost in the second round of the 2015 UK Championship 5–6 to Jack Lisowski. At the German Masters, he knocked out Tian Pengfei 5–0, Barry Hawkins 5–3, and Stephen Maguire 5–1, to play in his first ranking event semi-final in over two years. He was well below his best against Martin Gould as he lost the first four frames of the match and was defeated 2–6. Dott was eliminated in the third round of both the Welsh Open and China Open, 2–4 to Marco Fu and 1–5 to Noppon Saengkham respectively. Three tight wins helped him qualify for the World Championship, but he lost 4–10 to Mark Williams in the opening round.

2016/2017 season
The 2016–17 season proved to be the first since 2002/2003 that Dott failed to reach the quarter-finals of a ranking event. He had to wait until the 2017 Welsh Open in February to play in the third round of an event, after beating Ricky Walden and Adam Stefanów, but he lost 2–4 to Lee Walker. He qualified for the World Championship and beat Ali Carter 10–7 in the first round, before being defeated 6–13 by Barry Hawkins.

Personal life
In his 2011 autobiography Frame of Mind, Dott describes his childhood growing up in the run-down Easterhouse estate in Glasgow. As a boy, he developed a strong relationship with Alex Lambie, a snooker club owner from Larkhall in Lanarkshire, who mentored Dott from the age of 12 and went on to manage his professional career. Dott has described Lambie as a "second father" to him. In 1997, Dott began a relationship with Lambie's 16-year-old daughter Elaine. The couple married in 2003 and had their first child, a son named Lewis, in 2004.

In January 2006, Alex Lambie was diagnosed with terminal kidney cancer. Although he lived to see Dott win the World Championship in May of that year, he died on 16 December 2006, while Dott was playing in the 2006 UK Championship. Weeks afterward, Elaine, who was pregnant, had a cancer scare when doctors discovered potentially cancerous cysts on her ovaries. Although she turned out not to have cancer, she suffered a miscarriage while Dott was playing in the 2007 Masters. After these experiences, Dott entered a severe depression, which affected his commitment to practice and his performance in matches. He lost 15 professional matches in a row and slid down the rankings, dropping out of the top 16. Medication subsequently helped him recover his place in the top 16, although he expects his battle with depression to be lifelong. Dott and his wife had a second child, a daughter Lucy, born in November 2008.

Dott supports Rangers and paraded his World Championship trophy at Ibrox, their home ground, during half-time of Rangers' final league match against Hearts on 7 May 2006.

Performance and rankings timeline

Career finals

Ranking finals: 10 (2 titles)

Minor-ranking finals: 2

Non-ranking finals: 5 (1 title)

Pro-am finals: 9 (4 titles)

Team finals: 1 (1 title)

Amateur finals: 1 (1 title)

Sources

References

Further reading

External links

Graeme Dott at worldsnooker.com
Player profile on Global Snooker

Scottish snooker players
1977 births
Living people
Sportspeople from Larkhall
Winners of the professional snooker world championship